Thengamputhur is a panchayat town in Kanyakumari district in the Indian state of Tamil Nadu.

Demographics
 India census, Thengamputhur had a population of 12,669. Males constitute 50% of the population and females 50%. Thengamputhur has an average literacy rate of 80%, higher than the national average of 59.5%: male literacy is 82%, and female literacy is 78%. In Thengamputhur, 10% of the population is under 6 years of age.

References

Cities and towns in Kanyakumari district